The points classification is a secondary award category in road bicycle racing. Points are given for high finishes and, in some cases, for winning sprints at certain places along the route, most often called intermediate sprints. The points classification is the top prize for many cycling sprinters and is often known as the sprint classification; however, in some stage races these classifications are based on different criteria.

The points classification is arguably the second most important title and cycling jersey to win at a cycling stage race behind the general classification, which is the winner of the event by overall time.

Points classification winners of the Grand Tours

Winners by year

A.  Alessandro Petacchi was the Points leader but tested positive for elevated levels of salbutamol, resulting in a suspension and forfeiture of all results during the event. No alternate winner was declared.

Career triples 
Winning the points classification in each of the three Grand Tours during a cyclist's career is a significant accomplishment.  The Tour/Giro/Vuelta triple has been achieved by five riders:

  – 1 Giro points jersey (1994), 3 Tour points jerseys (1991, 1993, 1994), 1 Vuelta points jersey (1992)
  – 1 Giro points jersey (2013), 2 Tour points jerseys (2011, 2021), 1 Vuelta points jersey (2010)
  – 1 Giro points jersey (1999), 2 Tour points jerseys (1992, 1995), 4 Vuelta points jerseys (1994, 1995, 1996, 1997)
  – 2 Giro points jersey (1968, 1973), 3 Tour points jerseys (1969, 1971, 1972), 1 Vuelta points jersey (1973)
  – 1 Giro points jersey (2004), 1 Tour points jersey (2010), 1 Vuelta points jersey (2005)

Natural doubles 
Winning the points classification in two Grand Tours in a single year is a rare feat.

The Tour/Giro double has been achieved by one rider:
 Djamolidine Abdoujaparov (1994)

The Giro/Vuelta double has been achieved by one rider:
 Eddy Merckx (1973)

The Tour/Vuelta double has been achieved by four riders:
 Rudi Altig (1962)
 Jan Janssen (1967)
 Sean Kelly (1985)
 Laurent Jalabert (1995)

Most points jerseys (Grand Tours) 
9: Erik Zabel – 
 Tour de France (1996, 1997, 1998, 1999, 2000, 2001)
 Vuelta a España (2002, 2003, 2004)
 Note: In 2013, Zabel admitted to taking banned substances from 1996 to 2003, including EPO and the steroid hormone cortisone.
8: Sean Kelly – 
 Tour de France  (1982, 1983, 1985, 1989)
 Vuelta a España (1980, 1985, 1986, 1988)
8: Peter Sagan – 
 Tour de France (2012, 2013, 2014, 2015, 2016, 2018, 2019)
 Giro d'Italia (2021)
7: Laurent Jalabert – 
 Tour de France (1992, 1995)
 Giro d'Italia (1999)
 Vuelta a España (1994, 1995, 1996, 1997)
6: Eddy Merckx – 
 Tour de France (1969, 1971, 1972)
 Giro d'Italia (1968, 1973)
 Vuelta a España (1973)
5: Djamolidine Abdoujaparov – 
 Tour de France (1991, 1993, 1994)
 Giro d'Italia (1994)
 Vuelta a España (1992)
5: Jan Janssen – 
 Tour de France (1964, 1965, 1967)
 Vuelta a España (1967, 1968)

See also 
 Cycling sprinter
 Points classification in the Tour de France
 Points classification in the Giro d'Italia
 Points classification in the Vuelta a España
 List of Grand Tour points classification winners

References

Road bicycle racing terminology
Grand Tour (cycling)
Cycling records and statistics